Oscar Exequiel Zeballos (born 24 April 2002) is an Argentine professional footballer who plays as a winger for Boca Juniors.

Club career
Zeballos arrived at Boca Juniors in 2014, having had stints with Sarmiento de La Banda and Los Dorados de Termas de Río Hondo. In 2018, Zeballos signed his first professional contract; becoming the youngest Boca player to do so. The winger made the breakthrough into the first-team under Miguel Ángel Russo in 2020. He was an unused substitute four times before making his senior bow, including for a Copa Libertadores group stage encounter with Caracas on 22 October. In November, Zeballos made his debut in a Copa de la Liga Profesional victory at home to Newell's Old Boys on 29 November; after replacing Sebastián Villa.

International career
Zeballos represented Argentina at U15 and U17 level. He scored five goals at the 2017 South American U-15 Championship as they won the trophy. Two years later, Zeballos netted a goal at both the South American U-17 Championship and FIFA U-17 World Cup across eleven total appearances.He scored the sole goal that his team made in regular time for the Maradona Cup against Football club Barcelona.

Career statistics
.

Honours
Boca Juniors
 Primera División: 2022
 Copa Argentina: 2019–20
 Copa de la Liga Profesional: 2020, 2022
 Supercopa Argentina: 2022

Argentina U15
South American U-15 Championship: 2017

Argentina U17
South American U-17 Championship: 2019

Notes

References

External links

2002 births
Living people
Sportspeople from Santiago del Estero Province
People from La Banda
Argentine footballers
Argentina youth international footballers
Association football forwards
Argentine Primera División players
Boca Juniors footballers